The Commander-in-Chief of the Forces, later Commander-in-Chief, British Army, or just the Commander-in-Chief (C-in-C), was (intermittently) the professional head of the English Army from 1660 to 1707 (the English Army, founded in 1645, was succeeded in 1707 by the new British Army, incorporating existing Scottish regiments) and of the British Army from 1707 until 1904. In 1904 the office was replaced with the creation of the Army Council and the appointment of Chief of the General Staff.

Republican origins
In earlier times, supreme command of the Army had been exercised by the monarch in person. In 1645, after the outbreak of the English Civil War, Parliament appointed Thomas Fairfax "Captain General and Commander-in-Chief of all the armies and forces raised and to be raised within the Commonwealth of England". Thomas Fairfax was the senior-most military officer, having no superior, and held great personal control over the army and its officers. Lord Fairfax was styled "Lord General". None of his successors would use this title. In 1650, Fairfax resigned his post, shortly before the Scottish campaign of the War.

Oliver Cromwell, Fairfax's Lieutenant-General, succeeded him as Commander-in-chief of the Forces. Under Cromwell, the Commander-in-Chief was de facto head of state, especially after the dismissal of the Long Parliament. Cromwell held the office until 1653, when he was elected Lord Protector.

On 21 February 1660, the reconstituted Long Parliament resolved "that General George Monck be constituted and appointed Captain-General and Commander in Chief, under Parliament, of all the Land-Forces of England, Scotland and Ireland".

Post-Restoration history

After Monck's death, the post, which gave the holder significant military power, was abolished until James Scott, 1st Duke of Monmouth successfully petitioned Charles II and was granted it in 1674. After Monmouth's execution the post was again not filled until 1690, when it was bestowed upon John Churchill, Duke of Marlborough, during the King's absence in Ireland. It was likewise conferred on Meinhardt Schomberg, Duke of Schomberg the following year during the King's absence in Flanders, Marlborough having fallen from favour.

After 1660 it became rare for British sovereigns to lead their troops in battle (with the notable exception of King William III); instead, it became normative for command (especially in time of war) to be delegated to an individual, who usually held the appointment of Captain General or Commander-in-Chief of the Forces. (In early years these two titles were often used interchangeably, and/or the appointments were held concurrently). The office was not always filled: for example, James II and William III both functioned themselves as Commander-in-Chief; at other times the appointment simply lapsed (especially if there was no perceived immediate military threat).

With the appointment of General Lord Jeffrey Amherst in 1793, the Commander-in-Chief was given authority over matters of discipline, over supplies, training and promotions in the British Army. The establishment of a military staff took place under the oversight of his successor, Frederick, Duke of York.

In most instances, Commanders-in-Chief of the Forces were not Cabinet members (only Conway and Wellington had a seat in Cabinet by virtue of holding this office; Ligonier and Granby were also in Cabinet during their time in office, but in both cases sat as Master-General of the Ordnance). Instead, the British Army was represented variously and tenuously in government by the Paymaster of the Forces (Paymaster General from 1836), the Master-General of the Ordnance (who did not invariably have a seat in Cabinet), the Secretary at War (who was not usually a member of the Cabinet) and (from 1794) the Secretary of State for War.

With the demise of the Board of Ordnance in the wake of the Crimean War the Commander-in-Chief assumed command of the Ordnance troops: the Royal Regiment of Artillery and the Corps of Royal Engineers. The momentum of reform at this time, however, was toward increasing the authority of the Secretary of State for War. From the passing of the War Office Act 1870, as part of the Cardwell Reforms, the Commander-in-Chief was made clearly subordinate to the Secretary of State, to serve as the latter's principal military adviser, and was made to move out of his traditional office above the arch at Horse Guards and into the War Office. Nevertheless, in 1888 he is still described as having responsibility for all personnel and matériel issues for the army and auxiliary forces, and in 1895 he took on the responsibilities of chief of staff.

The appointment of Commander-in-Chief remained in the personal gift of the monarch, and its independence was guarded by Queen Victoria (among others) as emblematic of the notion that command of the Army was vested in the Crown; during her reign, however, the office was (in 1870) made much more clearly subordinate to the Secretary of State for War (and to Parliament).

Following the recommendations of the Esher Report, the office was replaced in 1904 with the creation of the Army Council and the appointment of Chief of the General Staff. The title reverted to the monarch, who remains (titular) "Commander-in-chief of the British Armed Forces".

The Forces
The British military (ie., that part of the armed forces committed to land warfare, and not to be confused with the naval forces) was originally made up of several forces, including the British Army, the others being: the Ordnance Military Corps of the Board of Ordnance (including the Royal Artillery, Royal Engineers, and Royal Sappers and Miners), being a professional, or regular force like the army); the Militia Force (or Constitutional Force), being a conscripted reserve infantry force able to be called out in times of emergency for home defence; the Yeomanry, being a similar mounted force; and the Volunteer Corps, made up of voluntary reserve units that normally only existed during wartime.  The Board of Ordnance was abolished in 1855 and its military corps, commissariat stores, transport, barracks and other departments were absorbed into the British Army, which was also called Regular Force or Regular Army). The Reserve Forces were also known as the Auxiliary Forces and the Local Forces (as their personnel could not originally be compelled to serve outside their local areas), and were re-organised in the 1850s with the Militia becoming voluntary (but with recruits engaging for a period of service that they were obliged to complete), and the Volunteer Force permanently established. These forces were increasingly integrated with the British Army during the final decades of the Nineteenth Century and the first decades of the Twentieth Century (the Yeomanry and Volunteer Force became the Territorial Force in 1908, and the Militia became the Special Reserve (and ceased to exist after the First World War).

Appointees
The following table lists all those who have held the post of Commander-in-Chief of the Forces or its preceding positions. Ranks and honours are as at the completion of their tenure:
† denotes people who died in office.

|-style="text-align:center;"
!colspan=7|Parliamentary General-in-Chief Command

|-style="text-align:center;"
!colspan=7|General-in-Chief Command

|-style="text-align:center;"
|colspan=7|Position vacant(3 January 1670 – 30 March 1674)
|-

|-style="text-align:center;"
|colspan=7|Position vacant(1 December 1679 – 3 June 1690)
|-

|-style="text-align:center;"
|colspan=7|Position vacant(1691 – 24 April 1702)
|-

|-style="text-align:center;"
|colspan=7|Position vacant(1714 – 1 January 1744)
|-

|-style="text-align:center;"
|colspan=7|Position vacant(1745 – 1745)
|-

|-style="text-align:center;"
|colspan=7|Position vacant(17 January 1770 – 19 March 1778)
|-

|-style="text-align:center;"
!colspan=7|Commander-in-Chief

References

Sources

External links
 Regiments.org
 Everything

Senior appointments of the British Army
British military commanders in chief

pl:Naczelni dowódcy British Army